KRXL is the regional Rock/Classic rock radio station in the Kirksville, Missouri area.  KRXL's primary audience is in the Kirksville/Ottumwa area, however their signal can reach places as far as Keokuk, Iowa, Quincy, Illinois, and Chillicothe, Missouri.

History 
KRXL was founded by Sam & Vera Burk in 1967, as an outgrowth of their successful AM station KIRX. At sign-on, September 17, 1967, KRXL had an effective radiated power of 52,000 watts. This was increased to the FCC maximum 100,000 watts in 1986. The KRXL music format was Easy Listening for many years, but by the late 1970s more Pop, Top 40, and Rock could be heard. A format known as Adult Contemporary welcomed the early 1980s airwaves, and remained that way until the end of the decade with a switch to Classic Rock. KRXL has a consistent history of award-winning broadcasting with multiple awards from the Associated Press and Missouri Broadcasters Association in categories such as news, DJ, and commercial production.

External links

RXL-FM
Classic rock radio stations in the United States